Low or LOW or lows, may refer to:

People
 Low (surname), listing people surnamed Low

Places
 Low, Quebec, Canada
 Low, Utah, United States
 Lo Wu station (MTR code LOW), Hong Kong; a rail station
 Salzburg Airport (ICAO airport code: LOWS), Austria

Music
 Low (band), an American indie rock group from Duluth, Minnesota

Albums
 Low (David Bowie album), 1977
 Low (Testament album), 1994
 Low (Low EP), 1994

Songs
 "Low" (Cracker song), 1993
 "Low" (Flo Rida song), 2007
 "Low" (Foo Fighters song), 2002
 "Low" (Juicy J song), 2014
 "Low" (Kelly Clarkson song), 2003
 "Low" (Lenny Kravitz song), 2018
 "Low" (Sara Evans song), 2008
 "Low", by Camp Mulla
 "Low", by Coldplay from the 2005 album X&Y
 "Low", by Inna from her 2015 self-titled album
 "Low", by Marianas Trench from the 2006 album Fix Me
 "Low", by R.E.M. from the 1991 album Out of Time
 "Low", by Silverchair from the 2007 album Young Modern
 "Low", by Sleeping with Sirens from the 2013 album Feel
 "Low", by SZA from the 2022 album SOS
 "Low", by Tech N9ne from the 2009 album K.O.D.
 "Low Low Low", by James from the 1993 album Laid

Other uses
 Launch on warning (LOW)
 Low (complexity), a concept in computational complexity theory
 Low (computability)
 Low (comics), an Image Comics series by Rick Remender and Greg Tocchini
 LOW Festival, a cultural festival
 Low-pressure area, a concept in meteorology
 Louise Weiss building, the seat of the European Parliament
 League of Wales, the top football league in Wales

See also 

 
 
 LO (disambiguation)
 Löw (disambiguation)
 Löwe (disambiguation)
 Lowe (disambiguation)